HMS Utmost was a British U class submarine, of the second group of that class, built by Vickers Armstrong, Barrow-in-Furness. She was laid down on 2 November 1939 and was commissioned on 17 August 1940.  So far she has been the only ship of the Royal Navy to bear the name Utmost.

Career

Utmost spent most of her career operating in the Mediterranean, where she sank the Italian merchants Capo Vita, Enrico Costa, and Frederico C., and the German tanker Languste and also damaged the Italian merchant Manfredo Camperio. Utmost also attacked a convoy of five German merchants and three Italian destroyers and torpedoed and sunk the German merchant Heraklea and torpedoed and damaged Ruhr. All torpedoes fired missed their targets.

Utmost went on to destroy the (already grounded and damaged) Italian merchant Marigola, and together with her sister, since transferred to the Poles, ORP Sokół, sank the Italian merchant Balilla.  Utmost later unsuccessfully attacked the Italian merchants Fabio Filzi and Siculo, as well as the Italian auxiliary minelayer Barletta.  She also torpedoed and damaged the Italian cruiser .

The Commanding Officer received a Distinguished Service Order for a mission, which is believed to have been the landing of agents behind enemy lines.

Sinking

Utmost left Malta for a patrol in the Mediterranean in November 1942.  On the 23rd she sank an enemy ship, but on 25 November 1942, during her return journey to Malta, she was located, attacked and sunk south west off Sicily by depth charges from the Italian torpedo boat .

References

External links
 IWM Interview with John Eaden, who commanded HMS Utmost in 1940

 

British U-class submarines
Ships built in Barrow-in-Furness
1940 ships
World War II submarines of the United Kingdom
Lost submarines of the United Kingdom
World War II shipwrecks in the Mediterranean Sea
Maritime incidents in November 1942
Submarines sunk by Italian warships